Haig is a surname of Old English origin. Notable people with the surname include:
Al Haig (1922–1982), American jazz pianist
Alan Haig-Brown (born 1941), Canadian novelist
Alan Haig-Brown (footballer) (1877–1918), British Army officer and footballer
Alexander Haig (1924–2010), U.S. Army general, White House Chief of Staff and U.S. Secretary of State
Brian Haig (born 1953), American novelist
David Haig (born 1955), British actor
David Haig (biologist) (born 1958), Australian biologist
Derek Haig, fictional character in Canadian TV series Degrassi: The Next Generation
Douglas Haig, 1st Earl Haig (1861–1928), senior British commander during World War I
Douglas Haig (actor) (1920–2011), American child actor in silent and sound films
George Haig, 2nd Earl Haig (1918–2009), British soldier and artist
Georgina Haig (born 1985), Australian actress
Henry Haig (1930–2007), English stained-glass artist
Ian Maurice Haig AM (1935–2014), Australian public servant and diplomat.
Jack Haig (disambiguation), several people
Jimmy Haig (1924–1996), New Zealand rugby player
Jimmy Haig (footballer) (1876–1943), Scottish footballer
John Thomas Haig (1877–1962), Canadian politician
Kenneth G. Haig (1879–1958), British physician and writer
Matt Haig (born 1975), British author
Ned Haig (1858–1939), Scottish rugby union player
Nigel Haig (1887–1966), British cricketer
Paul Haig (born 1960), Scottish musician
Richard Haig (born 1970), Welsh footballer
Roderick Haig-Brown (1908–1976), Canadian writer and conservationist
Shirley Haig (born 1950), New Zealand hockey player
Sid Haig (1939–2019), American actor

See also
Hague (disambiguation)
Haigh (surname)

References

Surnames of English origin
Surnames of Old English origin